A bunt is a batting technique in baseball or fastpitch softball. Official Baseball Rules define a bunt as follows: "A BUNT is a batted ball not swung at, but intentionally met with the bat and tapped slowly within the infield." To bunt, the batter loosely holds the bat in front of home plate and intentionally taps the ball into play. A properly executed bunt will create weak contact with the ball and/or strategically direct it, forcing the infielders to make a difficult defensive play to record an out.

Technique
The strategy in bunting is to ground the ball into fair territory, as far from the fielders as possible but within the infield. This requires not only physical dexterity and concentration, but also an awareness of the fielders' positions in relation to the baserunner or baserunners, their likely reactions to the bunt, and knowledge of the pitcher's most likely pitches.

The bunt is typically executed by the batter turning his body toward the pitcher and sliding one hand up the barrel of the bat to help steady it. This is called squaring up.  Depending on the situation, the batter might square up either before the pitcher winds up, or as the pitched ball approaches the plate. Sometimes, a batter may square up, then quickly retract the bat and take a full swing as the pitch is delivered.

Types

Sacrifice bunt
In a sacrifice bunt, the batter will put the ball into play with the intention of advancing a baserunner, in exchange for the batter being thrown out.  The sacrifice bunt is most often used to advance a runner from first to second base, though the runner may also be advanced from second to third base, or from third to home. The sacrifice bunt is most often used in close, low-scoring games, and it is usually performed by weaker hitters. A sacrifice bunt is not counted as an at-bat.  In general, when sacrifice bunting, a batter will square to bunt well before the pitcher releases the ball.

The squeeze play occurs when the batter sacrifices with the purpose of scoring a runner from third base.  In the suicide squeeze, in which the runner on third base starts running for home plate as soon as the pitcher starts to pitch the ball, it is integral that the batter bunt the ball successfully, or the runner will likely be tagged out easily.  Due to the high-risk nature of this play, it is not often executed, but can often be an exciting moment within the game. Alternatively, in the lower-risk safety squeeze, the runner on third waits for the ball to be bunted before breaking for home. If a runner scores in a squeeze play, the batter may be credited with an RBI.

Bunting for a base hit
A batter may also bunt for a base hit.  This is not a sacrifice play, because the batter is trying to reach base safely, without any intention of advancing a runner.  A batter may try to bunt for a base hit while there are runners on base.  In this case, if the runner advances and the batter is thrown out, and if the official scorer judges that the intention of the batter was to bunt for a base hit, then the batter will not receive credit for a sacrifice bunt.  A batter bunting for a base hit will often hold back his bunt while the pitcher begins delivering the ball, in order to surprise the fielders.  If successful, the bunt is scored as a hit single.  Rarely does a bunt result in a double, and never has one resulted in a triple or home run in MLB.

Often when attempting to bunt for a base hit, the batter will begin running as he is bunting the ball.  This is called a drag bunt.  Left-handed batters perform this more often than right-handed hitters, because their stance in the batter's box is closer to first base, and they do not need to run across home plate, where the ball will be pitched, as they bunt.

The action of squaring to bunt is compromised during a drag bunt, as the feet are not set.  Players sometimes get one hand up the barrel, and other times bunt with both hands at the base of the bat. There have been instances of one-handed drag bunts as well; Rafael Furcal has been known to try such a bunt.

Swinging bunt
A swinging bunt occurs when a poorly hit ball rolls a short distance into play, much like a bunt.  A swinging bunt is often the result of a checked swing, and only has the appearance of a bunt.  It is not a true bunt, and if the scorer judges that the batter intended to hit the ball, it cannot be counted as a sacrifice. There is also a "slug" bunt that is intended to surprise the opposing defense, as the desired effect is a hard-hit ball into the infield defense that is expecting a standard bunt.

Fielding a bunt

Fielding a bunt can be more difficult than fielding a normally batted ball.  Bunted balls are typically slow, so fielders must charge the ball to get to it quickly, in order to throw out a runner in time.  Well-placed bunts can sometimes be impossible to field, and result in base hits.  The tactic in bunting for a base hit is to hit the ball fast enough to get it past the pitcher, but slow enough to not allow time for the other infielders to make a play.  Bunting a ball into no-man's land – the triangle between the locations of the pitcher, first baseman, and second baseman, or between the pitcher, catcher and third baseman – can succeed because of uncertainty among the fielders as to which should field the ball and which should receive the throw to first base. It is not unusual for all three fielders to try to field the ball, and for nobody to cover the bag, or for no one to try to field the ball, assuming someone else will handle it. Teams use a rotation play to defend against the bunt: the first baseman will charge the bunt and the second baseman "rotates" out of his usual position to cover first base and receive the throw. The shortstop covers the base  towards which the runner is headed.

Special rules
A foul bunt that is not caught in flight is always counted as a strike, even if it is a third strike and thus results in a strikeout of the batter.  This is distinct from all other foul balls which, if not caught in flight, are only counted as a strike if not a third strike.  This special exception applies only to true bunts, not on any bunt-like contacts that might occur during a full swing or check-swing. If a batter bunts the ball and his bat hits the ball again after initial contact, it is a dead ball even if by accident.

Additionally, the infield fly rule is not applied to bunts popped-up in the air. Instead, the intentional drop rule (Rule 6.05k) that also applies to line drives can be invoked.

History
It is not known when the bunt was introduced; the earliest known reference to a bunt-like hit appears in the account of a game played in 1864 between the junior squads ("muffins") of the Brooklyn Excelsior and Enterprise clubs: "The feature of the play was the batting of Prof. Bassler of the Enterprise team...Being an original of the first water, he adopted an original theory in reference to batting, which we are obliged to confess is not of the most striking character. His idea is not a bad one though, it being to hit the ball slightly so as to have it drop near the home base, therefore necessitating the employment of considerable skill on the part of the pitcher to get at the ball, pick it up and throw it accurately to first base." But the batting technique now known as the bunt was almost certainly perfected by Dickey Pearce, one of baseball's early stars. For much of his career, Pearce used his 'tricky hit' to tremendous effect as the rules permitted it to roll foul and still be counted as a hit. The bunt was not common until the 1880s, and was not an accepted part of baseball strategy until the 20th century.  The bunt has enjoyed periodic waves of popularity throughout baseball history, coinciding with the periodic shifts of dominance between pitching and hitting over the decades.

During periods of pitching dominance, for example, during the dead-ball era or the 1960s, bunting was an important offensive weapon.  Conversely, during periods of hitting dominance, for example, the 1990s and 2000s, the value of the bunt has often been questioned.  Teams following the "Moneyball" school of baseball thought (such as the Oakland Athletics, the Boston Red Sox, and the 2004–2005 Los Angeles Dodgers) have shown a tendency to shun the sacrifice bunt almost entirely.  However, a canvass of the 2002–2005 World Series champions (the 2002 Los Angeles Angels being the "small ball" trendsetter for the 2000s) reveals that each team used bunting frequently in order to overcome power hitting teams. Nevertheless, the role of the bunt in baseball strategy is one of the perennial topics of discussion for baseball fans.

References

External links 
 

Baseball rules
Baseball strategy
Baseball terminology